"Everything was beautiful and nothing hurt" is a line from the 1969 novel Slaughterhouse-Five by Kurt Vonnegut, and may also refer to:

 Everything Was Beautiful and Nothing Hurt (Breakfast with Amy album)
 Everything Was Beautiful, and Nothing Hurt (Moby album)

See also
 Everything Was Beautiful, a 2022 album by Spiritualized
 And Nothing Hurt, a 2018 album by Spiritualized